Mary Jane Leach (born 1949) is an American composer based in New York City. She has been a member of the Downtown Ensemble, composer in residence at Sankt Peter, Köln, and has recordings on XI, New World Records, and Lovely Music. In the late 1970s Leach composed mainly with tape, overdubbing her own playing and singing. As her music became more frequently performed she continued writing in an "overdubbing" fashion, layering parts and experimenting with the textures created by multiple voices. Her compositional style is characterized by modality, imitation, and prolongation. Leach received a 1995 Foundation for Contemporary Arts Grants to Artists Award. She currently teaches music courses at Rensselaer Polytechnic Institute.

Leach is also the primary archivist and bibliographer of composer Julius Eastman. She met Eastman in 1981. In the late 1990s, she realized his music had been lost and set about collecting scores and recordings. With Renée Levine Packer, Leach edited Gay Guerrilla: Julius Eastman and His Music, the premiere book on Eastman's life and work.

Works
 Piano Concerto for Emanuele, 2010
 Piano E-Tude for Piano, Singer and Piano on Tape, 2009
 Four Play for four Violins, 1986/2007
 Labyrinthus for mixed Chorus and String Quartet, 2007
 Bach's Set for Solo Cello and eight Celli on tape, 2007
 Notes Passing Notes for two Female singers live und two Female singers on tape, 2007
 Gulf War Syndrome for Piano, Clarinet, Cello, Percussion and Tape or Synthesizer and Tape or Piano, Synthesizer, Clarinet, 2-4 Instruments and Tape, 2004, 2006
 Wolff Tones E-Tude for Piano and 4-6 Instruments, 2004
 Dido in a Minute for Synthesizer and Tape, 2003
 The Crane Dance for Soprano and eight part Female Chorus, 2002
 Dido Remembered for Synthesizer and Tape, 2002
 Copralalia, la la la for two sopranos and tape, 2002
 Bruckstück for eight or six part Female chorus, 1989, 2002
 The Great Goddess for eight part Female Chorus, 2001
 Glorious Ariadne for eight part Female Chorus, 2001
 By'm Bye for Piano, 2001
 Hear My Voice for Soprano, eight part Female Chorus and String Quartet, 2001
 I Sing of Warfare for Tenor, Male Chorus and String Quartet, 2001
 Night Blossoms for Vocal quartet a cappella, 2001
 Theseus Arrives for mixed chorus and String Quartet, 2000
 Minos for Tenor and mixed chorus, 1999
 The Sacred Dance for Soprano and String Quartet, 1999
 Call to the Ceremony for mixed chorus and String Quartet, 1999
 Ceremony of the Bull for mixed chorus and String Quartet, 1998
 First String for String Quartet, 1998
 O Magna Vasti Creta for eight part female chorus and String Quartet, 1997
 Call of the Dance for Soprano and eight part female chorus, 1997
 Ariadne's Lament for eight part female chorus or Trombone Choir, 1993, 1996
 Ariel's Song for eight part female chorus or Trombone Choir, 1987, 1996
 Song of Sorrows for mixed Chorus, 1995
 Windjammer for Oboe, Clarinet and Bassoon, 1995
 Tricky Pan for Solo Countertenor and eight Countertenors on tape, 1995
 Corrina Ocarina for Flute und Harp, 1994
 Xantippe's Rebuke for Solo Oboe and eight Oboes on tape, 1993
 He Got Dictators for Soprano, Piano and Bass, 1993
 Feu de Joie for Solo Bassoon and six Bassoons on Tape, 1992

 Kirchtraum, Hörspielmusik, 1992
 Bare Bones for four Trombones, 1989
 Pipe Dreams for Organ, 1989
 Sephardic Fragments for Soprano, 1989
 Mountain Echoes for eight part female chorus, 1987
 Guy de Polka for Accordion, 1987
 Ariel's Song for eight part female chorus, 1987
 Green Mountain Madrigal for eight part female chorus, 1985
 8 x 4 for Alto flute, Clarinet, English horn und Singer, 1985
 Trio for Duo for Alto flute and Singer, 1985
 4BC for four Bass clarinets, 1984
 Held Held for Alto flute and singer, 1984
 Note Passing Note for Solo Female Singer and Female Singer on tape, 1981

References

Living people
American women composers
21st-century American composers
Rensselaer Polytechnic Institute faculty
1949 births
21st-century American women musicians
20th-century American composers
20th-century American women musicians
Musicians from Vermont
20th-century women composers
21st-century women composers
American women academics